Ulzar (Uulzar) is a rural locality (a selo) in Dzhidinsky District, Republic of Buryatia, Russia. The population was 110 as of 2010. There are 20 streets.

References 

Rural localities in Dzhidinsky District